Llyrìa is an album by Swiss pianist and composer Nik Bärtsch's band Ronin recorded in France in 2010 and released on the ECM label.

Reception

The AllMusic review by Thom Jurek states "Ultimately, Llyria may be slightly more organic and emotional than previous Ronin discs, but it's very much of a piece with Bärtsch's overall musical vision, and longtime listeners will enjoy it as much as new ones". The Guardian'''s John Fordham noted "It's minimalism, but Bärtsch has always stretched the method beyond the minutiae of rhythmic and motivic changes to a more robust approach, informed by funk and soul".

Track listingAll compositions by Nik Bärtsch''
 "Modul 48" - 7:00   
 "Modul 52" - 8:18   
 "Modul 55" - 8:40   
 "Modul 47" - 8:02   
 "Modul 53" - 6:55   
 "Modul 51" - 9:53   
 "Modul 49_44" - 7:22

Personnel
 Nik Bärtsch — piano, electric piano
 Sha - bass clarinet, alto saxophone
 Björn Meyer — bass 
 Kaspar Rast - drums 
 Andi Pupato — percussion

References

ECM Records albums
Nik Bärtsch albums
2010 albums
Albums produced by Manfred Eicher